The 1992–93 season was the 91st in the history of the Western Football League.

The league champions for the first time in their history were Clevedon Town, who finished the season unbeaten and were promoted to the Southern League. The champions of Division One were Odd Down.

Final tables

Premier Division
The Premier Division was reduced from 21 to 20 clubs after Weston-super-Mare were promoted to the Southern League, and Ottery St Mary and Welton Rovers were relegated to the First Division. Two clubs joined:

Torquay United Reserves, runners-up in the First Division.
Westbury United, champions of the First Division.

First Division
The First Division was reduced from 22 clubs to 21, after Westbury United and Torquay United Reserves were promoted to the Premier Division, and Bath City Reserves and Clandown left the league. Three new clubs joined:

Clyst Rovers, promoted from the South Western League.
Ottery St Mary, relegated from the Premier Division.
Welton Rovers, relegated from the Premier Division.

References

1992-93
6